Keith Naughton is a Republican political consultant. He is best known for his work on statewide judicial campaigns.

He worked as campaign manager for Bruce Castor during the early stages of his campaign for Pennsylvania Attorney General. After Castor began attacking Pennsylvania Republican National Committee Robert B. Asher, Naughton stepped down.

He is recognized as "one of the most highly-successful operatives in Pennsylvania." In 2003, he managed the Susan Gantman's campaign for Pennsylvania Superior Court, the only statewide Republican victory that year. He also managed both statewide judicial campaigns for J. Michael Eakin.

He was named to the PoliticsPA list of "Republican Dream Team" political consultants. He was named to the PoliticsPA list of "Pennsylvania's Top Operatives." He was named runner-up "Operative of the Year" in 2003 by PoliticsPA.

References

Living people
Pennsylvania Republicans
Pennsylvania political consultants
Year of birth missing (living people)